The Sayidat al-Nejat Cathedral in Baghdad is a  Cathedral of the Syriac or Antiochian Catholic Church located in Baghdad, Iraq. in Karada The current bishop is Archbishop Yousif Abba and the cathedral is 380m from the Cathedral of Our Lady of Nareg. The church was subject of attack by Isis in 2010 and in 2004.

Sources and references 

Christianity in Baghdad
Syriac Catholic cathedrals
Eastern Catholic cathedrals in Iraq
Churches in Baghdad